Maxim Dmitriyevich Shostakovich (born 10 May 1938 in Leningrad) is a Soviet, Russian and American conductor and pianist. He is the second child of the composer Dmitri Shostakovich and Nina Varzar. Honored Artist of the RSFSR (1978).

Since 1975, he has conducted and popularised many of his father's lesser-known works.

He was educated at the Moscow and Leningrad Conservatories where he studied with Igor Markevitch and Otto-Werner Muellerbefore becoming principal conductor of the Moscow Radio Symphony Orchestra. During his tenure as principal conductor, he conducted the premiere of his father's Fifteenth Symphony on 8 January 1972.

On 12 April 1981, he defected to West Germany, and then later settled in the United States. After spells conducting the New Orleans Symphony Orchestra and the Hong Kong Philharmonic Orchestra he returned to St. Petersburg. In 1992, he made an acclaimed recording of the Myaskovsky Cello Concerto with Julian Lloyd Webber and the London Symphony Orchestra for Philips Classics.

Shostakovich is the dedicatee and first performer of his father's Piano Concerto No. 2 in F Major (Op. 102).

He has a son, Dmitri Maximovich Shostakovich (or Dmitri Shostakovich Jr.), who is a pianist.

Maxim Shostakovich has recorded a cycle of his father's 15 symphonies with the Prague Symphony Orchestra for the Czech label Supraphon.

See also
 List of Eastern Bloc defectors

References

External links

 Interview with Maxim Shostakovich, 10 July 1992

Maxim
1938 births
Living people
20th-century American male musicians
20th-century Russian conductors (music)
Russian male conductors (music)
20th-century Russian male musicians
21st-century American male musicians
21st-century Russian conductors (music)
21st-century Russian male musicians
Musicians from Saint Petersburg
Moscow Conservatory alumni
Honored Artists of the RSFSR
American male classical pianists
American classical pianists
American male conductors (music)
Russian people of Belarusian descent
Russian people of Polish descent
Russian classical pianists
Soviet people of Belarusian descent
Soviet people of Polish descent
Soviet classical pianists
Soviet conductors (music)
Soviet defectors
Soviet emigrants to the United States